In financial mathematics, the Ho–Lee model is a short-rate model widely used in the pricing of bond options, swaptions and other interest rate derivatives, and in modeling future interest rates. It was developed in 1986 by Thomas Ho and Sang Bin Lee.

Under this model, the short rate follows a normal process:

This calibration, and subsequent valuation of bond options, swaptions and other interest rate derivatives, is typically performed via a binomial lattice based model. Closed form valuations of bonds, and "Black-like" bond option formulae are also available.

As the model generates a symmetric ("bell shaped") distribution of rates in the future, negative rates are possible. Further, it does not incorporate mean reversion. For both of these reasons, models such as Black–Derman–Toy (lognormal and mean reverting) and Hull–White (mean reverting with lognormal variant available) are often preferred. The Kalotay–Williams–Fabozzi model is a lognormal analogue to the Ho–Lee model, although is less widely used than the latter two.

References
Notes

Primary references
 T.S.Y. Ho, S.B. Lee, Term structure movements and pricing interest rate contingent claims, Journal of Finance 41, 1986. 
 John C. Hull, Options, futures, and other derivatives, 5th edition, Prentice Hall,

External links
Valuation and Hedging of Interest Rates Derivatives with the Ho-Lee Model, Markus Leippold and Zvi Wiener, Wharton School 
Term Structure Lattice Models, Martin Haugh, Columbia University                                
Online tools
Binomial Tree – Excel implementation, thomasho.com

Fixed income analysis
Short-rate models
Financial models